Eriogonum molestum is a species of wild buckwheat known by the common name pineland buckwheat. It is endemic to southern California, where it grows in the Transverse Ranges of Ventura County to the Peninsular Ranges of San Diego County.

Description
Eriogonum molestum is an annual herb producing a slender, erect, hairless flowering stem up to a meter tall. The woolly, rounded to oblong leaves are located around the base of the stem. The branches of the inflorescence produce many small clusters of tiny white to pinkish flowers.

References

External links
Jepson Manual Treatment - Eriogonum molestum
Eriogonum molestum - Photo gallery

molestum
Endemic flora of California
Natural history of the California chaparral and woodlands
Natural history of the Peninsular Ranges
Natural history of the Santa Monica Mountains
Natural history of the Transverse Ranges